Dón Antonio Gil Ybarbo (1729–1809), also known as Gil Ybarbo, Gil Ibarbo, and many other name variants, was a pioneering settler of Nacogdoches, Texas.  Ambiguously described by the National Park Service as a "prolific trader and smuggler," Gil y'Barbo's contribution to Texas was essential to the well-being of "his people," and a critical element in providing a staging point for the Anglo-American settlers that would follow them.

Background

Antonio Gil  Ybarbo was born in 1729 at the presidio of Los Adaes, now in Louisiana but then at the far eastern reaches of the Spanish province of Texas. His parents were Spanish colonists Matheo Antonio y'Barbo, born in 1698 in Seville, Spain, and Juana Luzgarda Hernandez, also born in Seville in 1705. Matheo was attached to the Spanish military garrison deployed at Los Adaes ostensibly to defend New Spain against French expansion from Louisiana. The younger Antonio followed his father into the military but also became involved in cattle ranching, establishing a ranch near Lobanillo Creek, located in present-day Sabine County, Texas; at some point he married Maria Padilla, his first wife, and established a home at the Rancho Lobanillo.

Under the unusually stringent mercantilism of the Spanish Monarchy, life at such a remote outpost as Los Adaes could be difficult. It was a feature of colonial mercantilism that colonies existed for the benefit of the colonial power. Colonies could provide raw material for the mother country but were captive markets for any manufactured goods produced there. Spain was not alone in this, but in the Spanish case, it was required not only that goods be purchased from Spanish sources, but that they be delivered first to Veracruz, then Mexico City. Only then would they be sent overland to points north, first to Bexar and then another 300 miles up the El Camino Real to Los Adaes and the missions it nominally supported.  Legally, colonists were thus dependent on the government for basic goods like soap, sugar, seeds and clothing as well as farm equipment, weapons, and gunpowder. Because of these bizarre routing requirements, supplies were slow and erratic at best;  because competition, certainly competition from the French, was illegal, goods came at significantly higher prices than they might be obtained elsewhere. Given that the French outpost of Natchitoches was a mere 13 miles to the east, incentive to ignore the law—and for local officials to look the other way—was overwhelming. Much of the trade that made life bearable at Los Adaes was illegal.

Exodus

Originally established to counter French intrusions into Spanish territory, the Los Adaes outpost became superfluous when, in 1763, at the close of the Seven Years' War, Louisiana was ceded to Spain. In 1773, after an inspection of the former Texas frontier, the Marques de Rubi ordered the closing of the presidios and missions of East Texas. With little time to prepare, the military garrison, other colonists and all their families, by that time numbering around 500, were ordered to abandon the post and relocate to San Antonio de Bexar.

The Los Adaes settlement had existed for over 50 years, however, and for many Adaeseños the return to Bexar was no salvation from frontier hardship: They were being forced to leave their homes, and some simply avoided the order by leaving the compound and melting into the forest; some took temporary refuge with friendly Indians.
For the majority who obeyed the order, it would be an arduous trip.

An Ill-fated Compromise

Soon after arriving at Bexar, Gil Y'Barbo, who had emerged as their de facto leader even before the exodus from Los Adaes, made repeated efforts on behalf of the colonists petitioning authorities at Bexar to allow their return to the east. These efforts were of little avail. Fearing contraband trade with the English and Indian access to contraband firearms and powder, Inspector-in-Chief Hugo O'Conor refused. Eventually, Y'Barbo and Gil Flores traveled to Mexico City to lodge a personal entreaty with the viceroy, Antonio Maria de Bucareli y Ursúa. (It is a testament to their relationship with the native people of the area that a chief of the Tejas Caddo (el jefe Texito) made the trip with them to join the plea.) Surprisingly, the Viceroy relented, not only consenting to their returning as far as Los Ais, a settlement and mission near present-day San Augustine and one even closer to El Lobanillo than Los Adaes, but gaining ratification from a junta de guerra y hacienda called to consider the matter.

At this point O'Conor intervened. In scathing letters to the Baron de Ripperdá, governor of Texas, and the Viceroy, he condemned the entire plan. Citing the illegal trade in arms and ammunition known to have existed between the Adaeseños, the French and the northern tribes, he charged that Gil Y'Barbo actually schemed to reenter that illegal commerce. As a result, the earlier decision to approve was rescinded pending reconsideration. Partly because of O'Conor's preoccupation with Apache matters, the decision was ultimately left to Bucareli, who authorized Ripperdá to assist their move to "a suitable place" in the east, but to a location no closer than 100 leagues from Nachitoches.  Thus, a compromise was reached and they were permitted, in 1774, to move as far east as Paso Tómas on the Trinity River where they established the new colony of Nuestra Señora del Pilar de Bucareli. Named for the Viceroy, Antonio Maria de Bucareli y Ursúa, the new settlement would prove temporary, however.

To Viceroy Bucareli, the new site on the Trinity had appeared a reasonable location for a new outpost. It provided a way-station between Bexar and the then-Spanish presidio at Nachitoches,  it would provide a base for relations with friendly Bidais Indians in the area (who would presumably shield the settlers from the unfriendly Comanches) and it would serve as a check-point against illicit trade. Potentially, it was also seen as a foil against British free-booting from the upper coastal bend of Texas, a factor that loomed as Spain's alignment with the American cause against Britain developed.

For a while it seemed to work.  Relations with the local Indians were indeed improved, and in spite of the small contingent at Bucareli, Y'Barbo and his men were able to reconnoiter as far south as the coast, having some success in managing, or at least reporting, stray British ventures into the area.

Unfortunately, all that recommended Bucareli came to naught when, in 1777, the ranging Comanche discovered the little villa. Shortly thereafter, as was their stock-in-trade, they began periodic raids, stealing horses, stealing cattle and, in some cases, leaving Adaeseños dead or wounded. Making matters worse, the village, set as it was on the alluvial plain of the Trinity River, was subject to sporadic inundations and in December 1778 the community was struck by a particularly damaging flood.

By January 1779, many of the settlers had decided that Bucareli would have to be abandoned.

Return to the East

After five years, plagued by flood and increasing depredation from an expanding Comanche nation, the community pulled up stakes in early 1779 and, with no prior authority, moved back to the former Spanish mission at present-day Nacogdoches. There, at least, there was some greater security among the Nacogdoche, Nasoni and other Caddoan allies of eastern Texas, although the Nacogdoches area was not totally immune from the Comanche surge.

As noted, the location chosen by Gil y Barbo and his band had previously been occupied by a Spanish mission, Nuestra Señora de Guadalupe de los Nacogdoches.  However, by the 1770s that mission was among the several abandoned when Los Adaes was no longer needed to monitor possible incursions from the French-controlled territory of Louisiana.

Fortunately, the colonial administration was neither unaware of, nor unsympathetic to, the dire conditions at Bucareli. Apparently recognizing the move as a matter of survival, officials had within months not only granted approval for the new settlement, but had appointed Gil y Barbo to be Lieutenant-Governor of Nacogdoches, Captain of Militia, Judge of Contraband Seizures and Indian agent for the new district.
With this promotion and these new responsibilities (he had been Captain of the Bucareli post) came the not inconsiderable salary of 500 pesos per year.

Thus, as part of the overall Spanish efforts to enforce Royal sanctions against free trade and maintain relations with established Indian allies, the Spanish colonial government granted Gil Y'Barbo the authority to establish, operate and govern a permanent pueblo on the eastern reaches of the El Camino Real de los Tejas, a trail, really, that spanned virtually the entire Spanish province of Texas. Unlike the ill-fated Bucareli, that settlement, Pueblo Nuestra Señora del Pilar de Nacogdoches, was, indeed, permanent and survives today as the modern City of Nacogdoches, Texas.

Gil y Barbo used diplomatic skill to remove his band of 350 pioneers northeast from San Antonio to Bucareli; it could be argued he used initiative to lead them from Bucareli to Nacogdoches. There, the pilgrims built a thriving trading post, trading in all manner of goods, but the residents, as they had been at Los Adaes, were still under the restrictions of the archaic mercantilism of the Monarchy. This meant the new settlement had to rely patiently on Mexico City for basic goods or flout the law.  As it had been at Los Adaes, much of the trade that took place was illegal.

The Old Stone Fort
As was Spanish custom, the pueblo was laid out with a central plaza around which commercial and public life took place.  Later, as a result of his success in trading cattle, horses, deerskins and other commodities, Gil y'Barbo was able to construct, in 1788–1791, a two-story stone building located on the northeast corner of the plaza. La Casa de Piedra, the Spanish for "Stone House" as it was known, served principally as a trading post —the most important from Texas to Louisiana— but when needed, could also be pressed into service as a jail or a defensive position.  Still later known as the Old Stone Fort it was at the time the largest building in the province. Constructed of iron ore found in the area and with interior walls made of ten-by-fourteen-inch adobe blocks, it was also the most substantial. Following more than a century of use and after passing through numerous owners, the Stone Fort was, in 1902, dismantled to make way for a structure more suitable for commerce. In 1936, a replica of the fortress, said to use the original stones, was erected on the campus of Stephen F. Austin University. The replica stands today as a museum focusing on the early years of the city and state.

Legacy

Gil y Barbo died in 1809 at his ranch, La Lucana, located on the Attoyac Bayou, but is presumed to have been buried in the Old Spanish Cemetery, where the present Nacogdoches County Courthouse stands.

Antonio Gil y Barbo was an intelligent and resourceful individual whose contributions were significant to the maintenance of a European presence in eastern Texas following Spain's withdrawal from its presidio at Los Adaes.

As is true of the many families he led back to Nacogdoches, many descendants of Gil y'Barbo and his family  live today in eastern Texas,
southern Texas, western Louisiana and other parts of the Southwest. Over the years the surname has taken a variety of spellings, including Y'Barbo, Ibarvo, Barbe, Ebarb, Barber, and Barbo.

The trek of 1779 was a major element in the decision by the U.S. Congress in 2004 to elevate the Old San Antonio Road into the status of a National Historic Trail.  Since 1997, a statue of Gil y Barbo has greeted visitors to the Nacogdoches plaza laid out by the pioneer trader.

Notes

References

 
 
 
 
 

1729 births
1809 deaths
People from Nacogdoches, Texas
Tejano people
Spanish colonial governors and administrators